Nicholas II Sanudo (or Niccolò, also called Spezzabanda; died aft. 1374) was the Lord of Gridia (a fief in Andros) and eighth Duke of the Archipelago as the consort of his cousin Florence Sanudo, with whom he reigned until her death.

Nicholas was a son of Guglielmazzo Sanudo, Lord of Gridia. Florence's first marriage was to Giovanni dalle Carceri, but he died in 1358, without issue. She tried to remarry, first to the Vignoso, Genoese Lord of Chios, and then to Nerio I Acciajuoli, the future Duke of Athens, but both potential husbands were vetoed by the Republic of Venice, which kidnapped her and brought to Crete. There she was forced to marry in 1364 her cousin Nicholas Spezzabanda.

By his cousin, he left only daughters: Maria, who inherited Andros, and Elisabetta Sanudo.

Sources

References

 Ancestry of Sultana Nur-Banu (Cecilia Venier-Baffo)

Nicholas 02
Nicholas 02
Year of birth unknown
Year of death unknown
14th-century Venetian people